John Blackburn may refer to:

Arts and entertainment
 John Blackburn (songwriter) (1913–2006), American lyricist of "Moonlight in Vermont"
 John Blackburn (author) (1923–1993), English novelist
 John Blackburn (artist) (1932–2022), English painter
 John Blackburn (cartoonist) (1939–2006), American erotic comics creator
 John Blackburn (musician) (born 1976), English rock musician

Sports
 John Blackburn (footballer) (1851–1927), Scottish international footballer and military officer
 John Blackburn (cricketer) (1924–1987), English first-class cricketer
 John Donald Blackburn (born 1938), Canadian former professional ice hockey player

Other
John Blackburn (MP for City of York), represented City of York (UK Parliament constituency)
 John Blackburn (educator) (1924–2009), American university administrator
 John Blackburn (politician) (1933–1994), English Member of Parliament
 John Blackburn (priest) (1947–2021), Chaplain-General to the British Armed Forces, 2000–2004
 John C. Blackburn (died 1883), American politician
 John Thomas Blackburn (1912–1994), American naval aviator, World War II flying ace
 John Blackburn, CEO of Bloomington, Illinois-based Country Financial

See also 
 John Blackburne (disambiguation)